Rendine is a surname of Italian origin. Notable people with the surname include:

Furio Rendine (1920–1987), Italian composer, lyricist, producer, organizer and conductor
Sergio Rendine (born 1954), Italian composer of operas, symphonic, ballet and chamber music

References

Surnames of Italian origin